Hammud may refer to:
 Hammud, Iran
 Hammudid dynasty
 Hammud notable family of Sidon, Lebanon